The 1939–40 UCLA Bruins men's basketball team represented the University of California, Los Angeles during the 1939–40 NCAA men's basketball season and were members of the Pacific Coast Conference. The Bruins were led by first year head coach Wilbur Johns. They finished the regular season with a record of 8–17 and were fourth in the southern division with a record of 3–9.

Previous season

The Bruins finished the regular season with a record of 7–20 and were fourth in the southern division with a record of 0–12. At the end of the season, Caddy Works stepped down as head coach and was replaced by long time assistant Wilbur Johns.

Roster

Schedule

|-
!colspan=9 style=|Regular Season

Source

References

UCLA Bruins men's basketball seasons
Ucla
UCLA Bruins Basketball
UCLA Bruins Basketball